Kirovskoye is a rural locality (a selo) and the administrative center of Kirovsky Selsoviet, Aleysky District, Altai Krai, Russia. The population was 482 as of 2013. There are 13 streets.

Geography 
Kirovskoye is located 37 km north of Aleysk (the district's administrative centre) by road. Krasnodubrovsky is the nearest rural locality.

References 

Rural localities in Aleysky District